Gordon Wong Wellesley (8 December 1894 – 1980) was an Australian-born screenwriter and writer of Chinese descent. Born in Sydney in 1894 He wrote over thirty screenplays in the United States and Britain, often collaborating with the director Carol Reed. He began his career in Hollywood in the early 1930s and worked in Britain beginning about 1935. He was married to the scriptwriter Katherine Strueby. He was nominated for an Oscar for Best Writing, Original Story at the 1942 Oscars for Night Train to Munich, which was based on his novel, Report on a Fugitive.

Biography

Early life
Gordon Wellesley Wong was born in Australia, of English and Chinese descent and was educated in London.

By 1923 his short stories such as A Lesson in Cocktails were appearing in magazines. A biography around this time called him "one of the best known commercial men in the Federated Malay states."

In 1931 he was living in Kuala Lumpur. (Another article says he was from Singapore.) He was reportedly "a business man as well as a traveler, writer, explorer and official film producer for the Malayan government." A 1931 profile said he was educated at the University of London and had directed a Malayan picture called Black Sands "which created a lot of excitement in Europe".

Hollywood
He travelled to Hollywood in 1931, when he was 36 years old. He sold the film rights to his novel, Pagan River to Universal. He also sold a story he wrote about the Sino-Japanese war called Shanghai Interlude which was going to be made by director John Ford and star Lew Ayres.

He was using the name "Wong Wellesley" around this time. He says he did this "because with a Chinese surname I might be expected to write nothing but Chinese stories."

Pagan River was filmed as Nagana (1933).

Wellesley also worked on the script for Shanghai Madness (1933) made with Spencer Tracy. In July 1933 he left Los Angeles for London.

Britain
He moved to Britain in 1933. He wrote scripts for The Right to Live (1933) for Fox, and Over the Garden Wall (1934) for British International Pictures.

Associated Talking Pictures
Wellesley wrote a series of films for Associated Talking Pictures, the forerunner of Ealing Studios: Love, Life and Laughter (1934) with Gracie Fields and Java Head (1934) with Anna May Wong directed by Thorold Dickinson; the latter had Carol Reed as assistant director. Wellesley wrote a second film for Fields, Sing As We Go (1934), directed by Basil Dean.

Also for Dean he wrote Lorna Doone (1934) and a third with Fields, Look Up and Laugh (1935).

He was loaned out to work on the script for Death Drives Through (1935), independently done at Ealing, then helped write a comedy, No Limit (1935) for a new star, George Formby. It was a big hit and helped turn Formby into a movie star.

Wellesley worked on a biopic of Mozart for Dean, Whom the Gods Love (1936), and he did another for Fields, Queen of Hearts (1936). Wellesley wrote Laburnum Grove (1936), directed by Carol Reed and produced by Dean.

Producer and Night Train to Munich
Wellesley turned producer with The High Command (1937) for director Thorold Dickinson and Fanfare Films.

In early 1939 a short story of his was published, Report on a Fugitive.  It was bought by 20th Century Fox who turned it into Night Train to Munich (1940), directed by Reed and written by Frank Launder and Sidney Gilliat. The film was very successful in the UK and the US. In February 1942, Wellesley earned an Oscar nomination for his story for Night Train. It was the only nomination given to a British film that year.

Wellesley did some uncredited work on the script Sailors Three (1940) for Ealing. He also helped write Freedom Radio (1941), Atlantic Ferry (1941), and This Was Paris (1942).
In 1941 a script was being prepared based on a story of his, Lisbon Clipper.

He wrote two films for Walter Forde at Warners, Flying Fortress (1942) and The Peterville Diamond (1942).

Director
Wellesley turned director with The Silver Fleet (1942), a film whose storyline was based on a suggestion of President Roosevelt. He wrote and directed it in tandem with Vernon Sewell and the film was produced by Powell and Pressburger.

He directed Rhythm Serenade (1943) with Vera Lynn.

Wellesley returned to working just as a writer: The Shipbuilders (1943) and Mr. Emmanuel (1944).

Wellesley's later credits include The Lost People (1949), and The Reluctant Widow (1950) (which he also produced).

He ran a program for younger writers including William Rose at Denham Studios.

Television
He wrote episodes of Douglas Fairbanks Presents as well as the features The Green Scarf (1954) and The March Hare (1956)

Most of his later work was for TV: The Gay Cavalier, White Hunter, The Young Jacobites, International Detective, Sir Francis Drake and Beware of the Dog. He still wrote features such as Passport to China (1961), Dead Man's Evidence (1962), and Doomsday at Eleven (1962).

Later career
In 1967 he was awarded a Writers Guild Award for distinguished service.

Selected filmography
Nagana (1933) - writer of original novel
 Shanghai Madness (1933) - writer
The Right to Live (1933) - writer
 Love, Life and Laughter (1934) - writer
 Over the Garden Wall (1934) - writer
 Java Head (1934) - writer
 Sing As We Go (1934) - script editor
 Lorna Doone (1934) - writer
 Look Up and Laugh (1935) - scenario editor
 Death Drives Through (1935) - scenario editor
No Limit (1935) - scenario editor
 Whom the Gods Love (1936) - writer
Queen of Hearts (1936) - scenario editor
 Laburnum Grove (1936) - scenario editor
 The High Command (1936) - producer 
 Night Train to Munich (1940) - original story
Three Cockeyed Sailors (1940) - uncredited contribution to story
 Freedom Radio (1941) aka A Voice in the Night - story
 Atlantic Ferry (1941) - writer
 This Was Paris (1942) - story
 Flying Fortress (1942) - writer
 The Peterville Diamond (1942) - writer
 The Silver Fleet (1943) - co-director, writer
Rhythm Serenade (1943) aka I Love to Sing- director
 The Shipbuilders (1943) - writer, dialogue editor
Mr. Emmanuel (1944) - writer
The Lost People (1949) - producer
 The Reluctant Widow (1950) - writer, producer
Rheingold Theatre (1953) (TV series) - episode "The Heel" - writer
 The Green Scarf (1954) - writer
 The March Hare (1956) - writer
The Gay Cavalier (1956–57) (TV series) - writer
White Hunter (1957) (TV series) - writer
 The Young Jacobites (1960) - writer
International Detective (1960) (TV series) - writer
 Passport to China (1961) - writer
Dead Man's Evidence (1962) - script supervisor
Sir Francis Drake (1962) (TV series) - writer
Doomsday at Eleven (1962) - director
Beware of the Dog (1964) (TV series) - writer
Trouble with Junia (1967) (short) - director
The Edgar Wallace Mystery Theatre (1967) (TV series) - writer - episode "The Malpas Mystery"

Other writing
A Lesson in Cocktails (1923) - magazine story
The Bait (1923) - magazine serial
Anything Might Happen (1923) - magazine story
The Proper Thing (1923) - magazine story
Pagan River (1931) - magazine serial
Report on a Fugitive: A Drama of the Secret Service (1939) - magazine story
Lisbon Clipper (1941) - magazine story.
The Silver Fleet: The Story of the Film Put Into Narrative (1943) - book
Sec and the Occult (1973) - book

References

External links
Biography of Gordon Wellesley

Australian television writers
Australian screenwriters
1894 births
1980 deaths
Australian people of Chinese descent
Australian people of English descent
Australian emigrants to England
Writers from Sydney
Australian expatriates in the United States
20th-century Australian screenwriters
Australian male television writers